Sumida City Gymnasium (墨田区総合体育館) is a multi-purpose arena in Sumida, Tokyo, Japan. It is the home venue for Fugador Sumida from the Japanese futsal league, and also is the secondary venue for the Sun Rockers Shibuya basketball team.

Facilities
Rooftop Facilities　（5th Floor）, Multi-purpose Athletics Field and Multi-purpose Area
Spectator Stand and Running Course　（4th Floor）
Main and Sub-arenas　（3rd Floor）
Reception, Budo hall, Training Room, Studio and Cafeteria, Exhibition site of Sadaharu Oh, a Japanese baseball legend and a home-run king from Sumida 　（2nd Floor）
Indoor Pool and Parking Lot (1st Floor)

References

Basketball venues in Japan
Buildings and structures in Sumida, Tokyo
Indoor arenas in Japan
Sun Rockers Shibuya
Sports venues in Tokyo
Swimming venues in Japan
Tokyo Apache
Tokyo Cinq Rêves
Sports venues completed in 2010
2010 establishments in Japan